The 2018 Open Harmonie mutuelle was a professional tennis tournament played on hard courts. It was the fifteenth edition of the tournament which was part of the 2018 ATP Challenger Tour. It took place in Saint-Brieuc, France between 26 March and 1 April 2018.

Singles main-draw entrants

Seeds

 Rankings are as of 19 March 2018.

Other entrants
The following players received wildcards into the singles main draw:
  Evan Furness
  Manuel Guinard
  Antoine Hoang
  Ugo Humbert

The following players received entry into the singles main draw as special exempts:
  Grégoire Barrère
  Maxime Janvier

The following players received entry from the qualifying draw:
  Joris De Loore
  Laurynas Grigelis
  Tristan Lamasine
  Constant Lestienne

Champions

Singles

 Ričardas Berankis def.  Constant Lestienne 6–2, 5–7, 6–4.

Doubles

 Sander Arends /  Tristan-Samuel Weissborn def.  Luke Bambridge /  Joe Salisbury 4–6, 6–1, [10–7].

External links
Official Website

2018 ATP Challenger Tour
2018
2018 in French tennis
March 2018 sports events in France
April 2018 sports events in France